Tinchebray-Bocage is a commune in the Orne department in the Normandy region in north-western France. The result of the merger, on 1 January 2015, of the communes of Beauchêne, Frênes, Larchamp, Saint-Cornier-des-Landes, Saint-Jean-des-Bois, Tinchebray and Yvrandes.

See also
 Communes of the Orne department

References

Communes of Orne